{{Infobox college gymnastics team
|name = Nebraska Cornhuskers bowling
|founded = 
|logo = Nebraska Cornhuskers logo.svg
|logo_size = 125
|university = University of Nebraska–Lincoln
|athletic_director = Trev Alberts
|conference = Independent
|division = 
|location = Lincoln, Nebraska
|coach = Paul Klempa
|tenure = 4th
|arena = Sun Valley Lanes
|nickname = Cornhuskers
|capacity =
|national_champion = WIBC: 1991, 1995, 1997, 1999, 2001

NCAA: 2004, 2005, 2009, 2013, 2015, 2021|supersix =
|ncaa_regionals =
|ncaa_tourneys = 2004, 2005, 2006, 2007, 2008, 2009, 2010, 2011, 2012, 2013, 2014, 2015, 2016, 2017, 2018, 2019, 2021, 2022''
|conference_champion =
}}

The Nebraska Cornhuskers bowling''' team represents the University of Nebraska–Lincoln, competing as an independent in NCAA Division I. The program began as a club team, becoming a varsity sport in 1996 and an official NCAA sport in 2003. The Cornhuskers have since established themselves as the NCAA's premier bowling program. Nebraska has won eleven national championships, finished runner-up four times, and is the only program to qualify for every NCAA Bowling Championship.

History
Nebraska's bowling program began in 1990 as a club sport, coached by Bill Straub, who led the team to WIBC national titles in 1991 and 1995. Bowling became an official varsity sport at NU in 1996, and Straub was hired as the full-time head coach, winning additional national titles in 1997, 1999, and 2001. In 2003, the NCAA sanctioned its first women's bowling tournament, which Nebraska won. The Cornhuskers won the following year as well, and have since won three more titles and finished runner-up four times. The program has never been ranked lower than seventh. In 2019, Straub retired and longtime assistant Paul Klempa was named head coach.

Straub also led Nebraska's men's club bowling program through 1996, winning national titles in 1990 and 1996.

Coaches

Coaching history

Coaching staff

Awards

All-Americans
Nebraska has had thirty-seven players combine for eighty ATCA All-America honors.

National Bowler of the Year
Kim Berke – 1992
Diandra Hyman – 2000
Shannon Pluhowsky – 2001, 2004, 2005
Lindsay Baker – 2006
Amanda Burgoyne – 2007
Cassandra Leuthold – 2010
Lizabeth Kuhlkin – 2015
Raquel Orozco – 2020
Crystal Elliot – 2021

Season-by-season results

Notes

References

Bowling
Ten-pin bowling in the United States